Erythemis is a genus of dragonflies in the Libellulidae family, commonly known as pondhawks. These medium- to large-sized skimmers are voracious predators of other insects up to their own size, including other dragonflies.

The genus contains the following species:

Erythemis attala  – black pondhawk
Erythemis carmelita 
Erythemis collocata  – western pondhawk
Erythemis credula 
Erythemis haematogastra  – red pondhawk
Erythemis mithroides  – claret pondhawk
Erythemis peruviana  – flame-tailed pondhawk
Erythemis plebeja  – pin-tailed pondhawk
Erythemis simplicicollis  – eastern pondhawk
Erythemis vesiculosa  – great pondhawk

References

External links

 Erythemis, Discover Life

Libellulidae
Anisoptera genera
Taxa named by Hermann August Hagen